The Orontes minnow (Pseudophoxinus kervillei) is a species of ray-finned fish in the family Cyprinidae.
It is found in Israel, Jordan, Lebanon, and Syria.It is considered by some taxonomic authorities to be conspecific with the Levantine minnow.

References

Pseudophoxinus
Fish described in 1911
Taxonomy articles created by Polbot
Taxobox binomials not recognized by IUCN